The St Piran Football League is an English football league that was founded in 2019 to act as a feeder league to the South West Peninsula League, at step 7 of the National League System.

Member clubs 2022–23

West Division
Falmouth Town Reserves
Hayle
Helston Athletic Reserves
Illogan RBL
Ludgvan
Mousehole Development
Mullion Reserves
Penryn Athletic
Perranporth
Perranwell
Porthleven
Redruth United
St Agnes
St Day
Truro City Reserves
Wendron United Reserves

East Division
A.F.C. St Austell Reserves
Altarnun
Callington Town Reserves
Gunnislake
Launceston Reserves
Millbrook Reserves
Morwenstow
Polperro
St Dominick
St Mawgan
Saltash Borough
Saltash United Reserves
Sticker Reserves
Torpoint Athletic Reserves

Champions

References

Football leagues in England
Amateur association football
Football leagues in Cornwall
Sports leagues established in 2019
2019 establishments in England